Salman Faris (born 18 November 1985) is a Sri Lankan-born cricketer who played for the United Arab Emirates national cricket team. He played for the United Arab Emirates in the 2014 Cricket World Cup Qualifier tournament.

References

1985 births
Living people
Emirati cricketers
United Arab Emirates One Day International cricketers
United Arab Emirates Twenty20 International cricketers
Place of birth missing (living people)
Sri Lankan emigrants to the United Arab Emirates
Sri Lankan expatriate sportspeople in the United Arab Emirates